Notable people named August Müller or August Mueller include:

 August Friedrich Müller (1684–1761), a German legal scholar and logician
 August Eberhard Müller (1767–1817), a German composer, organist and choir leader
 August Müller (inventor) (1864–1949), a German pioneer in the manufacture of contact lenses
 August Müller (orientalist) (1848–1892), a German orientalist
August B. Mueller (1905–1996), an American politician from Minnesota

See also
Auguste Müller (1847-1930), a German folk carver